Mister M, Mr M, Mr. M, may refer to:

 Mister M (comics), a Marvel Comics character
 "Mr. M" (song), a 2004 single by Four Day Hombre
 The Mysterious Mr. M, a 1946 movie serial by Universal Studios
 Val Valentino, the famous "Masked Magician"
 Mr. M (album), a 2012 album by Lambchop

See also

 MRM (disambiguation)

pt:Mister M